Maqbool Habib H. Rahimtoola (born 1945) is a businessman and politician based out of Karachi, Pakistan. He served as Minister for Textiles and Commerce in the Khoso caretaker ministry in 2013. He also remained Provincial Minister in the Caretaker Government of Sindh during 1996–97.

Early life 
He was born to Habib Rahimtoola and Zubeida Habib Rahimtoola. He received his early education from Karachi Grammar School and Westminster School in the United Kingdom. He graduated from McGill University in 1968.

Career 

He served as the Federal Minister of Commerce and the Textile Industries of Pakistan in the Khoso caretaker ministry in 2013. From 1996 to 1997, he simultaneously served as Sindh Minister for 11 ministries: Local Govt., Industries, Commerce, Mines and Minerals, Housing, Town Planning, Labor, Transport, Kaatchi Abadies, Public Health Engineering, Rural Development,c 1996–1997. He chaired several Public Sector organisations. He was leader of the Pakistan Delegation to Trade Minister Conference AIMS 2013.

He served as managing director of investment company Bandenawaz (Pvt) Ltd. He served as chair of Berger Paints Pakistan Limited and Mirpurkhas Sugar Mills Limited. He was a director of Dadex Eternit Limited.

Rahimtoola served on many Committees of the Chambers of Commerce & Industry, Karachi, FPCCI, the Standards Institute of Pakistan and the Board of Investment (GOP). He is a Member of the Petroleum Institute of Pakistan. He led the Pakistan Business Delegation to the United Nations on occasions such as the UNCTAD/GATT Seminar in Hong Kong and was the Pakistan Representative to UNIDO/GATT World Packaging Conference.

He served as Secretary General of the Pakistan/Japan Cultural Association and the Pak-France Business Alliance. He served as a Member of the Pak-Belgium Business Forum. He served as President of Drigh Road Lions Club.

He lectured at the Air War College on Strategic Planning for Energy He served as Pro Chancellor of the Pakistan Fashion & Design Institute and Chair of the Trade Development Authority of Pakistan.

Recognition 

 International Trophy for Technology in Germany 
 Achievement Award from the Overseas Graduates of Pakistan Club (2004)

References

External links 

 Mirpurkhas Sugar Mills Ltd (MPKS.KA) People | Reuters.com www.reuters.com/finance/stocks/companyOfficers?symbol...KA o o Reuters
 
 Mr. Maqbool HH Rahimtoola – PIDC pidc.com.pk/director/maqboolhhrahimtoola.php Mr. Maqbool H.H Rahimtoola, has over 40 years of corporate experience. ... been a Technocrat Minister in the caretaker Government of Sindh during 1996–1997
 Son of Habib Ibrahim Rahimtoola Pakistan's first High Commissioner to Great Britain •	Habib Ibrahim Rehmatullah (redirect from Habib Ibrahim Rahimtoola) Habib Ibrahim Rahimtoola. (حبیب ابراہیم رحمت اللہ. 10 March 1912 – 2 January 1991) was the first High Commissioner to the UK for Pakistan ... 3 KB (311 words) – 09:54, 2 September 2014
 Grandson of Sir Ibrahim Rahimtoola •	Central Legislative Assembly (section presidents of the Assembly) Speaker of the Lok Sabha , the lower house of the Parliament of India |! ... 4 | |Ibrahim Rahimtoola | 17 January 1931 – 7 March 1933 | ... 21 KB (2,912 words) – 03:32, 19 August 2014

Living people
1945 births
Pakistani chief executives
Pakistani Ismailis
Pakistani people of Gujarati descent
Federal ministers of Pakistan
Businesspeople from Karachi
McGill University alumni
People educated at Westminster School, London
Karachi Grammar School alumni
Provincial ministers of Sindh